Jim Swaffield is an American music video director and video editor. He has worked with A Tribe Called Quest, DJ Jazzy Jeff & The Fresh Prince and Coolio. He is also known for working with R. Kelly on Trapped in the Closet.

Filmography as director

Music videos

Direct-to-video films

Awards and nominations

External links

References 

Living people
American music video directors
American film directors
Year of birth missing (living people)